The Twenty-first, Twenty-second, and Twenty-third Dynasties ruled Egypt from the 10th century through the 8th century BC. The family tree of the Twenty-first dynasty was heavily interconnected with the family of the High Priests of Amun at Thebes. The Twenty-second dynasty and Twenty-third dynasty were also related by marriage to the family of the High Priests.

Family tree

 - Pharaoh of 21st Dynasty
 - Pharaoh of 22nd Dynasty
 - Pharaoh of 23rd Dynasty
 - High Priest of Amun

References

See also

Twenty-first dynasty of Egypt
Twenty-second Dynasty of Egypt
Twenty-third Dynasty of Egypt

Ancient Egyptian family trees

family tree
family tree
family tree
10th century BC in Egypt
9th century BC in Egypt
8th century BC in Egypt
Egyptian family tree
Egyptian family tree
Egyptian family tree